Sokić is a  Serbian surname.

. Notable people with the surname include:

Ljubica Sokić (1914–2009), Serbian painter
Ružica Sokić (1934–2013), Serbian actress and writer
Sreten Sokić (born 1945), Serbian political scientist, economist, businessman, and professor

Serbian surnames